The Golden Girls is a television sitcom that ran on NBC from September 14, 1985, to May 9, 1992. A total of 180 episodes were produced, including 7 one-hour episodes.

Series overview

Episodes

Season 1 (1985–86)

Season 2 (1986–87)

Season 3 (1987–88)

Season 4 (1988–89)

Season 5 (1989–90)

Season 6 (1990–91)

Season 7 (1991–92)

Television special

Ratings

References

External links
 
 

The Golden Girls
Lists of American sitcom episodes